Adelphicos is a genus of New World burrowing snakes in the family Colubridae. The genus consists of nine species.

Geographic range
Species of the genus Adelphicos can be found in Mexico and northern Central America (Belize and Guatemala).

Species
There are nine species which are recognized as being valid.
Adelphicos daryi  – Dary's burrowing snake
Adelphicos ibarrorum  – Ibarras' burrowing snake
Adelphicos latifasciatum  – Oaxaca burrowing snake
Adelphicos newmanorum  – Middle American burrowing snake
Adelphicos nigrilatum  – burrowing snake
Adelphicos quadrivirgatum  – Middle American burrowing snake
Adelphicos sargii  – Sargi's earth snake
Adelphicos veraepacis  – Stuart's burrowing snake
Adelphicos visoninum  – Middle American burrowing snake

Etymology
The specific name, newmanorum (Latin, genitive, plural), is in honor of American zoologist Robert J. Newman and his wife Marcella Newman.

The specific name, sargii (Latin, genitive, singular), is in honor of Franz Sarg (1840–1920) who served as German Consul in Guatemala.

References

Further reading
Jan G (1862). "Enumerazione sistematica delle specie d' ofidi dell gruppo Calamaridae". Archivio per la Zoologia l'Anatomia e la Fisiologia 2: 1–76. (Adelphicos, new genus, pp. 18–19). (in Italian).

 
Snake genera
Taxa named by Giorgio Jan